The Metropolitan Borough of Gateshead is a metropolitan borough in the metropolitan county of Tyne and Wear, North East England. It includes Gateshead, Rowlands Gill, Whickham, Blaydon, Ryton, Felling, Birtley, Pelaw, Dunston and Low Fell. The borough forms part of the Tyneside conurbation, centred on Newcastle upon Tyne.

It is bordered by the local authorities areas of Newcastle upon Tyne to the north, Northumberland to the west, County Durham to the south, Sunderland to the south-east, and South Tyneside to the east. The borough had a population of over 202,000.

History
The district is located within the historic county boundaries of County Durham. It is south of the River Tyne, the historic county boundary between Northumberland and Durham. The metropolitan borough was formed in 1974 through the merger of the county borough of Gateshead with the urban districts of Felling, Whickham, Blaydon, Ryton and part of Chester-le-Street Rural District, with the borough placed in the new metropolitan county of Tyne and Wear. In 1986 Tyne and Wear county council was abolished.

There were originally two civil parishes in Gateshead - Birtley and Lamesley, both from the Chester-le-Street RD. Birtley Town Council and parish were abolished on 1 April 2006.

Governance

Parliamentary constituencies
In national government the borough contains two parliamentary constituencies, Gateshead and Blaydon. The Gateshead constituency covers the centre and east of the borough. The MP, first elected in 2010, is Ian Mearns. The Blaydon constituency covers the west of the borough and Birtley to the south. It is represented by Liz Twist. The Jarrow constituency takes in the very eastern tip of the borough, including Pelaw. It is represented by Kate Osborne.

Local government

Councillors

In total there are 22 electoral wards in the borough, each of which elects three councillors. The wards are:

 Birtley
 Blaydon
 Bridges (Gateshead Town Centre)
 Chopwell and Rowlands Gill
 Chowdene
 Crawcrook, Greenside and Clara Vale
 Deckham
 Dunston and Teams
 Dunston Hill and Whickham East
 Felling
 Heworth
 High Fell (includes Sheriff Hill)
 Lamesley
 Leam Lane Estate
 Lobley Hill and Bensham
 Low Fell
 Pelaw and Heworth
 Ryton, Crookhill and Stella Park
 Saltwell
 Wardley and Leam Lane
 Whickham North
 Whickham South and Sunniside
 Windy Nook and Whitehills
 Winlaton and High Spen

Gateshead Council is Labour controlled. In total there are 54 Labour councillors and 12 Lib Dem councillors. In general, the Whickham area along with Low Fell tend to favour the Liberal Democrats. Pelaw, Ryton and Dunston Hill are more evenly matched between the two parties, and the rest of the borough is dominated by Labour, especially the East. UKIP were able to get 23% of the vote in Winlaton and High Spen in 2016, while the Liberal Party have one of their few strongholds in Birtley, where they once held. The Conservatives rarely get more than 10%, polling best in Bridges and Saltwell wards; both of these have large Jewish communities.

General
Gateshead has hosted two major political conferences. The first of these was Labour's spring conference, ahead of the 2005 general election. The Conservatives also held a conference at the Sage Gateshead in March 2008. The Conservatives do not have any councillors in Gateshead and at the time only had one MP in the whole of the north east region. That conference was seen as an attempt to connect to voters in the area.

Education

Gateshead has a number of schools across the borough at both primary and secondary level. Results are well above average, with a number of outstanding schools. Gateshead has amongst the best primary and secondary schools in the country overall. A range of schools are present in Gateshead, including Jewish, Roman Catholic, Church of England, Methodist, and non-religious state schools. There is one independent school in the borough, Chase school in Whickham. Further independent schools can be found in Newcastle, Sunderland, and Tynedale.

Gateshead town itself has a further education college, Gateshead College, and a leading Jewish higher education institution, Beth Midrash Lemoroth — Jewish Teachers Training College.

Environment
Gateshead has a variety of landscapes, urban and industrial areas include the town itself, Whickham and Blaydon in the west, with more semi-rural and rural locations in the west including Ryton and Rowlands Gill. Overall though, it is a fairly green area with over half of the borough being green belt or countryside. Most of this is located away from built up Tyneside to the south of the borough into Derwentside/Chester-le-Street and to the west into Tynedale.

In total, there are over twenty countryside sites in the borough, from ancient meadows and woodland to local nature reserves.

Notable features of Gateshead's countryside include Ryton Willows, found at Old Ryton Village on the banks of the Tyne at Ryton. Ryton Willows is 43 hectares of locally rare grassland and ponds located near to an affluent village with Georgian and Victorian houses. Because of this it is a Site of Special Scientific Interest.

The Derwent Valley, in the south/south west of the borough, offers panoramic views and pleasant walks. It was in the Derwent Valley, near Rowlands Gill, that the Northern Kites Project re-introduced red kites. This was part of a national project to introduce the birds, that were once so commonplace across the country, back into the wild. This scheme has proven to be a success, with birds being spotted across the west of the borough, from Crawcrook to Rowlands Gill itself.

The borough also contains one National Trust site, the expansive Gibside estate near Rowlands Gill, containing a stately home and a chapel, parts of its grounds have also been given SSSI status.

Even in the more urban areas of the borough, in Gateshead itself and to the east, efforts have been made to maintain green spaces and wildlife sites. One such project is Bill Quay Community Farm, east of the borough. Offering a rural experience within an urban setting, it provides an important educational tool for local schools.

Religion
The 2001 census stated that the borough's predominant religion was 80.25% Christian. Other statistics found 10.94% of no religion, 6.94 unstated, 0.82% Jewish and 0.60% Muslim.

The 2011 census, stated that the Metropolitan Borough of Gateshead was 67.0% Christian, 0.9% Muslim, 1.5% Jewish, 23.9% were not religious and 5.7% of the population refused to state their religion.

Economy
The area was once dependent on heavy industry such as steel making in the Derwent Valley and coal mining (across the borough). Shipbuilding on the Tyne was also a major source of employment. However, with the decline of these industries, Gateshead has attempted to re-invent itself. Although there are significant areas of deprivation in the borough, particularly in the centre and east, a number of towns and villages in the borough are popular with commuters and professionals who are employed in the service industry and well paid areas of the secondary sector such as engineering (which remains a major source of employment). Such commuter areas include Ryton, Rowlands Gill, Whickham and Low Fell. The borough is host to Tyne Yard, a major rail freight yard serving the North East.

Gateshead Quayside, once dominated by industry, has benefited from significant investment and gentrification in the past decade. It is now home to the Baltic Centre for Contemporary Art and the Sage Gateshead.

The area is also an important retail hub, with the largest shopping centre in the European Union, and second largest in Europe as a whole, the MetroCentre, situated adjacent to the A1 trunk road. Further retail, and a significant number of engineering companies are located in the Team Valley Trading Estate, which at one time was the largest industrial estate in Europe.

Arts and culture
Gateshead is home to the Baltic Centre for Contemporary Art and the Sage Gateshead. The Anthony Gormley structure, the Angel of the North (the largest free standing sculpture in the United Kingdom) is in Gateshead. This puts Gateshead at the forefront of the arts both regionally and nationally.

The Shipley Art Gallery, housing outstanding collections of contemporary craft, studio ceramics, paintings and decorative art, is managed by Tyne & Wear Archives & Museums on behalf of Gateshead Council. Gateshead is a library authority and within its Central Library is a large venue facility called the Caedmon Hall.

Sports
Gateshead has an association football team, Gateshead F.C., who play in the English . They play at the Gateshead International Stadium, which also hosts athletics.

Freedom of the Borough
The following people  have received the Freedom of the Borough of Gateshead:

 Jonathan Edwards: 24 November 2000.
 Brendan Foster: 20 November 2004.
 Mike Neville: 12 October 2006.
 Baroness Quin of Gateshead: 12 October 2006.
 Lord Burlison of Rowlands Gill : 12 October 2006.
 Robert Moncur: 22 January 2009.  
 David Almond: 10 February 2011.
 David Clelland: 10 February 2011.
 Sir John Hall: 10 February 2011.
 Professor Paul Younger: 8 November 2011.
 Sir Antony Gormley: 24 July 2012.
 Alan J. Smith: 24 July 2012.
 Stephen Miller: 25 June 2013.
 Jill Halfpenny: 7 November 2013
 Lord Puttnam: 26 March 2015.

In addition, freedom was granted to 72 Engineer Regiment on 9 July 2011.

References

Metropolitan boroughs of Tyne and Wear
 Borough